Wolves is the second full-length release album by Washington duo Idiot Pilot. It was produced by Ross Robinson (At the Drive-In, Glassjaw) and Mark Hoppus (singer and bassist of +44 and Blink 182).  The third track, "Retina and the Sky" was also featured on the soundtrack of Michael Bay's film Transformers.  The album had a delayed release, first digitally on August 20, 2007 and physically October 2, 2007. Wolves features guest performers Travis Barker on drums in "Elephant" and Chris Pennie on drums in the rest of the tracks. Cover art is by Frank Maddocks Design.

On October 2, 2007 the only way to purchase a copy of Wolves was either through the band's official website or digitally on iTunes. The disc was available at stores starting February 12, 2008.

Background 
Based out of Bellingham, WA, since the age of 12 Michael Harris and Daniel Anderson of Idiot Pilot have been producing and composing music. With the release of Strange We Should Meet Here back in 2004 with Clickpop Records, and then a re-release in 2005 with reprise record; fans have been waiting for the release of their latest album Wolves. With renowned producer Ross Robinson (At The Drive-In, Glassjaw) and Mark Hoppus(singer and bassist of +44 and Blink 182), Idiot Pilot spent four months in the studio recording Wolves.

Reception and aftermath 

The release of Wolves pushed Idiot Pilot on the mainstream scene. Their second song "Elephant" had Travis Barker on drums which brought a larger fan base from Blink 182. Their third song on the album, "Retina and the Sky", made its way on to the Transformers soundtrack. With the initial success of the album, Idiot Pilot joined the Taste of Chaos tour with Bullet For My Valentine and Avenged Sevenfold in late 2008. Early 2009, Idiot Pilot parted ways with their record company Reprise of four years "due to artistic differences".

Track listing

Personnel 

Idiot Pilot
Michael Harris - Lead vocals, Guitar
Daniel Anderson - Guitar, programming, bass guitar, keyboards, unclean vocals
Additional Musicians
Travis Barker - Drums on "Elephant"
Chris Pennie - Drums

Artwork
Frank Maddocks - Creative Director, design, photography
Darren Ankenman	- Photography

Production
Ross Robinson -  Producer
Mark Hoppus - Producer
Ted Jensen - Mastering
Craig Aaronson & Rachel Howard - A&Rs
James Ingram & Paul Turpin - Engineers
Chip Westerfield - Engineer, vocal producer
Tim Palmer & Jamie Seyberth Mixing

References

Idiot Pilot albums
Reprise Records albums
Albums produced by Mark Hoppus
Albums produced by Ross Robinson
2007 albums